Lachezara Stoeva (born 1977) is a Bulgarian diplomat currently serving as Permanent Representative of Bulgaria to the United Nations. In July 2022 she was elected President of the United Nations Economic and Social Council.

Biography
Stoeva studied political science at Sofia University and European politics and government at the London School of Economics, obtaining Master's degrees from both institutions.

She joined the Ministry of Foreign Affairs of Bulgaria in 2002, heading its Department of International Development Cooperation from 2012 to 2013 and its Department of Arms Control and Non-Proliferation from 2013 to 2014.

Stoeva served as Deputy Permanent Representative of Bulgaria to the United Nations from 2016 to 2019 (having previously been acting Deputy) before directing the Department of Economic, Financial and Administrative Affairs of the United Nations in the Ministry of Foreign Affairs.

In 2021 she was appointed Permanent Representative to the United Nations, and in 2022 was elected President of the United Nations Economic and Social Council.

References

1977 births
Living people
Sofia University alumni
Alumni of the London School of Economics
Bulgarian women diplomats
Permanent Representatives of Bulgaria to the United Nations